Mario Boccalatte (4 May 1933 – 10 March 2021) was an Italian professional footballer who played as a midfielder.

Career
Born in Biella, Boccalatte played for Biellese, Cossatese, Saluzzo, Monza and Reggiana.

Later life
After retiring as a footballer he worked for a bank, and died on 10 March 2021, aged 87.

References

1933 births
2021 deaths
Italian footballers
A.S.D. La Biellese players
A.C.S.D. Saluzzo players
A.C. Monza players
A.C. Reggiana 1919 players
Serie D players
Serie C players
Serie B players
Association football midfielders